Country Boy Livin is a collaborative album by American rappers Young Bleed and Chucky Workclothes. The album was released on July 1, 2014, by Trap Door Entertainment and Express Life Entertainment. A promotional mixtape of the album titled "Country Boy Livin' (Blendtape) was released on DatPiff a month prior to its release.

Track listings
Intro (Pick'em up Nelson) - 0:33
Coming to Your Town - 3:08
Paperwork - 3:14
Long Days and Highways (featuring Joey Souf) - 5:15
Country Boy Gangstas - 3:17
Skit (Pick'em up Nelson) - 0:19
Alright Already - 3:36
Who's Who (featuring Ko) - 3:09
Get It On - 3:15
Clockwork - 2:40
Shut Shit Down - 3:47
Livin' Up (featuring Millaboi) - 3:46
Skit (Pick'em up Nelson) - 0:48
All Country (featuring Big Mike) - 4:35
Break-A-Bitch College (featuring Philthy Phil) - 3:47
Legendary - 2:48
Outro (Pick'em up Nelson) - 2:15

References

External links
Country Boy Livin' on iTunes.
Country Boy Livin' on Amazon.com
Country Boy Livin' on Discogs.

2014 albums
Young Bleed albums
Chucky Workclothes albums
Collaborative albums